The 22845/46 Hatia–Pune Superfast Express is a Superfast Express train belonging to Indian Railways – South Eastern Railways that runs between  and  in India.

It operates as train number 22845 from Pune Junction to Hatia and as train number 22846 in the reverse direction.

Coaches

The 22845/46 Hatia–Pune Superfast Express presently has 1 AC 2 tier, 3 AC 3 tier, 9 Sleeper Class, 4 Sleeper Class & 2 SLR (Seating cum Luggage Rake) coaches.

As with most train services in India, coach composition may be amended at the discretion of Indian Railways depending on demand.

Service

The 22845/46 Hatia–Pune Superfast Express covers the distance of 303 kilometers in 4 hours 30 mins (67.33 km/hr) in both directions.

As the average speed of the train is above 55 km/hr, as per Indian Railways rules, its fare includes a Superfast surcharge.

Routeing

It reverses direction at Daund Junction.

Traction

An Ajni-based WAP-7 hauls the train from Hatia until Pune Junction.

Time Table

22846 Hatia–Pune Superfast Express leaves Hatia every Monday & Friday at 20:00 hrs IST and reaches Pune Junction at 02:45 hrs IST on the 3rd day.
22845 Pune–Hatia Superfast Express leaves Pune Junction every Wednesday & Sunday at 10:45 hrs IST and reaches Hatia at 17:10 hrs IST the next day.

External links

References 

Express trains in India
Rail transport in Jharkhand
Rail transport in Chhattisgarh
Rail transport in Maharashtra
Transport in Pune
Transport in Ranchi